This list of jazz bassists includes performers of the double bass and since the 1950s, and particularly in the jazz subgenre of jazz fusion which developed in the 1970s, electric bass players.

The most influential jazz double bassists from the 1940s and 1950s include bassist Jimmy Blanton (1918–1942) (a member of the Duke Ellington band); Oscar Pettiford (1922–1960), who is considered by bassists and musicologists to be the first bebop bassist and the transitional link from the swing era to bebop. Ray Brown (1926–2002), known for backing a number of beboppers, including alto virtuoso Charlie Parker; Milt Hinton (1910–2000) and George Duvivier (1920–1985), who are the two most recorded bassists in jazz history, their respective careers spanning many eras and genres; a singular creative force was Wilbur Ware (1923–1979) legendary bassist with Monk and others, hard bop bassist Ron Carter (born 1937); and Paul Chambers (1935–1969), a member of the Miles Davis Quintet.

In the experimental post 1960s eras, which saw the development of free jazz and jazz-rock fusion, some of the influential bassists included Charles Mingus (1922–1979) and free jazz and post-bop bassist Charlie Haden (1937–2014).

In the post-1970s era of jazz-rock fusion, the electric bass became an important jazz instrument; virtuoso Stanley Clarke (born 1951) played both the double bass and the electric bass. Fusion performer Jaco Pastorius (1951–1987) contributed to the development of a new approach to the fretless electric bass, adding a creative use of harmonics and chords, both while a member of the band Weather Report and in his solo recordings.

In the 1990s and 2000s, one of the new "young lions" for jazz bass was Christian McBride (born 1972).
In mid to late 2000s, another new "young lion" for jazz bass emerged: Miles Mosley (born 1980) a member of the acclaimed Los Angeles collective, the West Coast Get Down.

For double bass players in other styles of music, such as Blues and Folk, see the List of double bassists in popular music.

A

Ahmed Abdul-Malik (1927–1993)
Placide Adams (1929–2003)
Samuel Adams (born 1985)
Osama Afifi
Moses Allen (1907–1983)
Vernon Alley (1915–2004) 
Ben Allison (born 1966)
Bjørn Alterhaug (born 1945)
Hayes Alvis (1907–1972)
Andreas Amundsen (born 1980)
Erik Amundsen (1937–2015)
Arild Andersen (born 1945)
Thomas Winther Andersen (born 1969)
Reid Anderson (born 1970)
Bjørnar Andresen (1945–2004)
Chuck Andrus (1928–1997)
Roger Arntzen (born 1976)
Jim Aton (1925–2008)
Edvard Askeland (born 1954)
Tine Asmundsen (born 1963)

B

Harry Babasin (1921–1988)
Roy Babbington (born 1940)
Don Bagley (1927–2012)
Steve Bailey (born 1960)
Victor Bailey (1960–2016)
Fred Thelonious Baker (born 1960)
Tom Barney
Phil Bates (born 1931)
Carles Benavent (born 1954)
Joe Benjamin (1919–1974)
Max Bennett (1928–2018)
Frode Berg (born 1971)
Chuck Berghofer (born 1937)
Dan Berglund (born 1963)
Jeff Berlin (born 1953)
Artie Bernstein (1909–1964)
Keter Betts (1928–2005) 
Carlos Bica (born 1958) 
Charlie Biddle (1926–2003)
Alex Blake (born 1951)
Jimmy Blanton (1918–1942)
Svein Olav Blindheim (born 1954)
Jesper Bodilsen (born 1970)
Richard Bona (born 1967)
Jimmy Bond (1933–2012)
Walter Booker (1933–2006)
Arthur "Juinie" Booth (1948–2021)
Nelson Boyd (1928–1985) 
Ronnie Boykins (1935–1980)
Wellman Braud (1891–1966)
Ellen Brekken (born 1985)
Brian Bromberg (born 1960)
Harvey Brooks (born 1944)
Baron Browne
Cameron Brown (born 1945)
 Paul H. Brown (1934–2016)
Ray Brown (1926–2002)
Steve Brown (1890–1965)
Bunny Brunel (born 1950)
Monty Budwig (1926–1992)
Tony Bunn (born 1957)
Oteil Burbridge (born 1964)
Dwayne Burno (1970–2013)
Lennie Bush (1927–2004)

C

Eddie Calhoun (1921–1993
Red Callender (1916–1992)
James Cammack (born 1956)
Alain Caron (born 1955)
Dave Carpenter (1959–2008)
Ron Carter (born 1937)
Edo Castro (born 1957)
Malcolm Cecil (1937–2021)
Clive Chaman (born 1949)(first recording was on Ram John Holder's 1969 London Blues album)
Paul Chambers (1935–1969)
Stanley Clarke (born 1951)
John Clayton (born 1952)
Jeff Clyne (1937–2009)
Avishai Cohen (born 1970)
Greg Cohen (born 1953)
Ira Coleman (born 1956)
Scott Colley (born 1963)
Graham Collier (1937–2011)
Joe Comfort (1917–1988)
Todd Coolman (born 1954)
Curtis Counce (1926–1963)
Anthony Cox (born 1954)
Bob Cranshaw (1932–2016)
Gary Crosby (born 1955)
Israel Crosby (1919–1962)
 Bill Crow (born 1927)

D

Lars Danielsson (born 1958)
Palle Danielsson (born 1946)
Alec Dankworth (born 1960)
Art Davis (1934–2007)
Kenny Davis (born 1961)
Melvin Lee Davis
Richard Davis (born 1930)
Chuck Deardorf (born 1954)
Spanky DeBrest (1937–1973)
Santi Debriano (born 1955)
Riccardo Del Fra (born 1956)
Fredrik Luhr Dietrichson (born 1988)
Brandi Disterheft (born 1980)
Dominique Di Piazza (born 1959)
Wayne Dockery (1941–2018)
Chuck Domanico (1944–2002)
Leon Lee Dorsey (born 1958)
Mike Downes 
Mark Dresser (born 1952)
Kermit Driscoll (born 1956)
Ray Drummond (born 1946)
Sébastien Dubé (born 1966)
Trevor Dunn (born 1968)
Dominic Duval (c. 1944 – 2016)
George Duvivier (1920–1985)
Mbizo Johnny Dyani (1945–1986)

E

Nathan East (born 1955)
Kyle Eastwood (born 1988)
Jimmy Earl (born 1957)
Cleveland Eaton (1939–2020)
Kai Eckhardt (born 1961)
Mark Egan (born 1951)
Johannes Eick (born 1964)
Mats Eilertsen (born 1975)
Audun Ellingsen (born 1979)
Audun Erlien (born 1967)
Oytun Ersan (born 1978)
Julian Euell (1929–2019)

F

 Charles Fambrough (1950–2011)
 Addison Farmer (1928–1963)
 Malachi Favors (1927–2004)
 Hadrien Feraud (born 1984)
 Ric Fierabracci (born 1963)
 Brent Fischer (born 1964)
 Arnold Fishkind (1919–1999)
 Trygve Waldemar Fiske (born 1987)
 Ingebrigt Håker Flaten (born 1971)
 Foley (musician) (born 1962)
 Joe Fonda (born 1954)
 Svein Folkvord (born 1967)
 Signe Førre (born 1994)
 Mo Foster (born 1944)
 Herbie Flowers (born 1938)
 Pops Foster (1892–1969)
 Henry Franklin (born 1940)
 David Friesen (born 1942)

G

Larry Gales (1936–1995) 
Renaud Garcia-Fons (born 1962)
Juan Garcia-Herreros (born 1977)
Ed Garland (1895–1980)
Kåre Garnes (born 1954)
Jimmy Garrison (1934–1976)
Matthew Garrison (born 1970)
Vivien Garry (died 2008)
Leonard Gaskin (1920–2009)
Victor Gaskin (1934–2012
John Geggie

Terje Gewelt (born 1960)
Eddie Gibbs (1908–1994) 
John Giblin (born 1952)
Steve Gilmore (born 1961)
Ole Amund Gjersvik (born 1963)
Lincoln Goines (born 1953)
Doc Goldberg
Eddie Gómez (born 1944)
Coleridge Goode (1914–2015)
Calum Gourlay (born 1986)
Sebastian Gramss (born 1966)
Dave Green (born 1942)
Larry Grenadier (born 1966)
Drew Gress (born 1959)  
Tony Grey (born 1975)
Henry Grimes (1935–2020)
Duke Groner (1908–1992)
Finn Guttormsen (born 1968)
Ketil Gutvik (born 1972)
Barry Guy (born 1947)
Janek Gwizdala (born 1978)

H

Charlie Haden (1937–2014)
Bob Haggart (1914–1998)
Al Hall (1915–1988)
Stuart Hamm (born 1960)
Aslak Hartberg (born 1975)
Jimmy Haslip (born 1951)
Michel Hatzigeorgiou (born 1961)
Tim Hauff (born 1952)
Nick Haywood (born 1961)
Percy Heath (1923–2005)
Spike Heatley (1933–2021)
Mark Helias (born 1950)
Jonas Hellborg (born 1958)
Michael Henderson (born 1951)
Shifty Henry (1921–1958) 
Svante Henryson (born 1963)
Milt Hinton (1910–2000)
Derrick Hodge (born 1979)
Colin Hodgkinson (born 1945)
Sigurd Hole (born 1981)
Dave Holland (born 1946)
Major Holley (1924–1990)
Scotty Holt
Fred Hopkins (1947–1999)
Jim Hughart (born 1936)
Spike Hughes (1908–1987)
Stig Hvalryg (born 1960)

I

Dieter Ilg (born 1961)
Peter Ind (1928–2021)
Dennis Irwin (1951–2008)
Itzam Cano
Jeff Irwin (born 1977)
Chuck Israels (born 1936)
Carl Morten Iversen (born 1948)
David Izenzon (1932–1979)

J

Ali Jackson (died 1987)
Alvin Jackson
Anthony Jackson (born 1952)
Chubby Jackson (1918–2003)
Paul Jackson (1947–2021)
Randy Jackson (born 1956)
Kristian B. Jacobsen (born 1992)
Michael Janisch (born 1979)
Neil Jason
Harald Johnsen (1970–2011)
Alphonso Johnson (born 1951)
Bill Johnson (1872–1972)
Gordon Johnson (born 1952)
Louis Johnson (1955–2015)
Marc Johnson (born 1953)
Darryl Jones (born 1961)
Isham Jones (1894–1956)
Percy Jones (born 1947)
Sam Jones (1924–1981) 
José José (1948–2019)
Anders Jormin (born 1957)
Hans Otto Jung (1920–2009)

K

Olaf Kamfjord (born 1962)
Konrad Kaspersen (born 1948)
Red Kelly (1927–2019)
Tom Kennedy (born 1960)
James King (1942–2012)
Gary King (1947–2003)
Mark King (born 1958)
John Kirby (1908–1952)
Andy Kirk (1898–1992)
Bjørn Kjellemyr (born 1950)
Larry Klein (born 1956)
Rob Kohler (born 1963)
Kristin Korb
Teddy Kotick (1928–1986) 
Peter Kowald (1944–2002)
Ashley Kozak (c. 1930 – 2008)

L

Abraham Laboriel (born 1947) 
 Scott LaFaro (1936–1961)
 Tim Landers (born 1956)
 Rick Laird (1941–2021)
 Jim Lanigan (1902–1983)
 Dominic Lash (born 1980)
 Chris Laurence (born 1949)
 James Leary (1946–2021)
 Ray Leatherwood (1914–1996)
 Jay Leonhart (born 1940)
 Jennifer Jane Leitham (born 1953)
 Jack Lesberg (1920–2005)
 Herbie Lewis (1941–2007)
 Julius Lind (born 1977)
 Wilbur Little (1928–1987)
 Joe Long (1941–2021)
 Israel "Cachao" López (1918–2008)
 Orlando "Cachaíto" López (1933–2009)
 Al Lucas (1912–1983)
 Curtis Lundy (born 1955)
 Brian Lawrence (born 1976)

M

 Bob Magnusson (born 1947)
 Michael Manring (born 1960)
 Wendell Marshall (1920–2002)
 Ron Mathewson (1944–2020)
 Per Mathisen (born 1969)
 Cecil McBee (born 1935)
 Christian McBride (born 1972)
 Ron McClure (born 1941)
 Andy McKee (born 1953)
 Al McKibbon (1919–2005)
 Sondre Meisfjord (born 1975)
 Chucho Merchán (born 1952)
 Jymie Merritt (1926–2020)
 Björn Meyer (born 1965)
 Pierre Michelot (1928–2005)
 Big Miller (Clarence Horatius Miller) (1922–1992)
 Harry Miller (1941–1983)
 Marcus Miller (born 1959)
 Charles Mingus (1922–1979)
 Red Mitchell (1927–1992)
 Whitey Mitchell (1932–2009)
 Guro Skumsnes Moe (born 1983)
 Charnett Moffett (born 1967)
 Joe Mondragon (1920–1987)
 Monk Montgomery (1921–1982)
 Glen Moore (born 1941)
 Michael Moore (born 1945)
 Al Morgan (1920–2011)
 Thomas Morgan (born 1981)
 Peck Morrison (1919–1988)
 George Morrow (1925–1992)
 John Mosher (1928–1998)
 Miles Mosley (born 1980)
 George Mraz (1944–2021)
 Jo Berger Myhre (born 1984)

N

Buell Neidlinger (1936–2018)
Magnus Skavhaug Nergaard (born 1989)
Rune Nergaard (born 1983)
Steve Novosel (born 1940)

O

Jordan O'Connor (born 1972)
Patrick O'Hearn (born 1954)
Linda Oh (born 1984)
Ugonna Okegwo (born 1962)
Darek Oleszkiewicz (born 1963)
Eivind Opsvik (born 1973)
John Ore (1933–2014)

P

Walter Page (1900–1957)
Caterina Palazzi (born 1982)
Pino Palladino (born 1957)
Truck Parham (1911–2002)
William Parker (born 1952)
Jaco Pastorius (1951–1987)
Johnny Pate (born 1923)
John Patitucci (born 1959)
Mario Pavone (1940–2021)
Alcide "Slow Drag" Pavageau (1888–1969)
Gary Peacock (1935–2020)
Niels-Henning Ørsted Pedersen (1946–2005)
Aladár Pege (1939–2006)
Ralph Peña (1927–1969)
Gene Perla (born 1940)
Oscar Pettiford (1922–1960)
Barre Phillips (born 1934)
Martin Pizzarelli (born 1963)
Lonnie Plaxico (born 1960)
Terry Plumeri (1944–2016) 
Robert Popwell (1950–2017)
Tommy Potter (1918–1988)
Pino Presti (born 1943)
Rocco Prestia (1951–2020)
Jodi Proznick (born 1975)

R

Chuck Rainey (born 1940)
Steinar Raknes (born 1975)
Gene Ramey (1913–1984)
Nat Reeves (born 1955)
Rufus Reid (born 1944)
Marius Reksjø (born 1973)
Eric Revis (born 1967)
Jim Richardson (born 1941)
Georg Riedel (born 1934)
Steve Rodby (born 1954)
Reuben Rogers (born 1974)
Gabe Rosales (born 1978)
Howard Rumsey (1917–2015)
Daryl Runswick (born 1946)
Curley Russell (1917–1986)

S

Harvie S (born 1948)
Igor Saavedra (born 1966)
Eddie Safranski (1918–1974)
Ole Marius Sandberg (born 1975)
Fernando Saunders (born 1957)
Tony Saunders
Patrick Scales (born 1965)
Tony Scherr
Lynn Seaton (born 1957)
Clarence Seay (born 1957)
Karl E. H. Seigfried (born 1973)
Pat Senatore (born 1935)
Avery Sharpe (born 1954)
Arvell Shaw (1923–2002)
Todd Sickafoose (born 1974)
Alan Silva (born 1939)
John Simmons (1918–1979)
Andy Simpkins (1932–1999)
Len Skeat (1937–2021)
Audun Skorgen (born 1967)
Baard Slagsvold (born 1963)
Carson Smith (1931–1997)
Putter Smith (born 1941)
Rhonda Smith
Teddy Smith (1932–1979)
Esperanza Spalding (born 1984)
Victor Sproles (1927–2005)
Neal Starkey
Leroy "Slam" Stewart (1914–1987)
Øyvind Storesund (born 1975)
Ben Street
Jon Rune Strøm (born 1985)
Neil Stubenhaus (born 1953)
Ted Sturgis (1913–1995)
Ike Sturm (born 1978)
Christian Meaas Svendsen (born 1988)
Neil Swainson (born 1955)
Steve Swallow (born 1940)

T

 Jamaaladeen Tacuma (born 1956)
 Carl Frederick Tandberg (1910–1988)
 Sandra Riley Tang (born 1990)
 Ares Tavolazzi (born 1948)
 Billy Taylor (1906–1986)
 Dylan Taylor (born 1960)
 Henri Texier (born 1945)
 Kostas Theodorou (born 1965)
 Danny Thompson (born 1939)
 Don Thompson (born 1940)
 Magne Thormodsæter (born 1973)
 Wayman Tisdale (1964–2009)
 Jannick Top (born 1947)
 Brian Torff (born 1954)
 Frank Tusa (born 1947)
 Bjørnar Kaldefoss Tveite (born 1987)
 Tyler Joseph (born 1988)

U

Sigurd Ulveseth (born 1953)
Phil Upchurch (born 1941)

V

Ole Morten Vågan (born 1979)
Hein van de Geyn (born 1956)
Terje Venaas (born 1947)
Mads Vinding (born 1948)
Leroy Vinnegar (1928–1999)
Miroslav Vitous (born 1947)
Louis Vola (1902–1990)

W

Ellen Andrea Wang (born 1986)
Wilbur Ware (1923–1979)
Butch Warren (1939–2013)
Peter Washington (born 1964)
Rob Wasserman (1952–2016)
Doug Watkins (1934–1962) 
Hank Wayland (1906–1983)
Eberhard Weber (born 1940)
Rodney Whitaker (born 1968)
Andrew White (also sax, oboe) (1942–2020)
Chris White (1936−2014)
Tal Wilkenfeld (born 1986)
Buster Williams (born 1942)
David "Happy" Williams (born 1946)
Gary Willis (born 1957)
Quinn Wilson (1908–1978)
Ben Wolfe (born 1962)
Chris Wood (born 1969)
Jimmy Woode (1926–2005)
Victor Lemonte Wooten (born 1964)
Reggie Workman (born 1937)
Eugene Wright (1923–2020)
Herman Wright (born 1932)

Y

Walt Yoder (1914–1978)
Dave Young (born 1940)
Eldee Young (1936–2007)

Z

Per Zanussi (born 1977)
Chester Zardis, nickname: "Bear" or "Little Bear" (1900–1990)
Stuart Zender (born 1974)

See also

 List of contemporary classical double bass players
 List of jazz musicians

References

Bassists
Bassists